Castell Mawr (known in English as Castle Rock) is a large limestone rock that dominates the western shore of Red Wharf Bay in Anglesey, north Wales. It was probably once the site of an Iron Age fort, but today the rock is a protected refuge for nesting seabirds.

It is located between the village of Red Wharf Bay and the promontory where St. David's Holiday Park is sited. The closest large villages are Pentraeth and Benllech.

The site is notable for being the only location on Anglesey displaying genuine karst development in a series of small caves and solutional cavities.

Castell Mawr was selected by the Countryside Council for Wales because of its geological interest, as it provides exposures of carboniferous limestone strata. The rock consists of limestone and sandstone layers, part of the Benllech Limestone formed during the Brigantian Stage of the lower Carboniferous period. The limestone was once mined and exported to other centres in the UK and Ireland.

References

Mountains and hills of Anglesey
Pentraeth